Rebelution is a reggae rock music band formed in Isla Vista, California.  The current members of Rebelution are Eric Rachmany, Rory Carey, Marley D. Williams, and Wesley Finley. Each member attended and completed school at the University of California, Santa Barbara.

History

Formation and Courage to Grow (2004–2007) 
Rebelution was formed in the college town of Isla Vista, California, in 2004. The five original band members were Eric Rachmany, Matt Velasquez, Rory Carey, Marley D. Williams, and Wesley Finley, who were all University of California, Santa Barbara students.

Throughout 2004–2005, Rebelution began to build momentum through consistently playing local shows and by independently releasing an EP. All four current members graduated from UC Santa Barbara, getting degrees in religious studies (Rachmany), anthropology (Finley), film studies (Williams), and business economics (Carey).

Rebelution released their first full-length album Courage to Grow on June 8, 2007, which would become the breakthrough album for the band. The album was praised for its crafty melodies, socially conscious lyrics, and savvy musicianship. Courage to Grow went on to garner mass downloads and radio play on stations such as San Francisco's Live 105 where their single "Safe and Sound" was played on heavy rotation, with spins on San Diego's 91X and Los Angeles's KROQ. The album was selected as iTunes Editor's Choice for Best Reggae Album of 2007. In addition, Courage to Grow peaked at #4 on the Billboard Top Reggae Albums chart.  However, Velasquez, one of the two vocalists, left after the release of Courage to Grow because of growing tired from the rigorous touring lifestyle, and left Rebelution as a four-member band.

Bright Side of Life (2009)
Two years after their first album, Rebelution released their second full-length album Bright Side of Life. On August 4, 2009 Bright Side of Life was officially released and dominated the iTunes charts, reaching the #1 spot on iTunes in the Reggae music genre, and the #3 spot for Top Albums Downloaded in the United States in all genres of music. The album also reached #1 on the Billboard Top Reggae Albums chart and #54 on Billboards Top 200.

The release of Bright Side of Life marks the first release under Rebelution's newly founded record label "87 Music" (named after their address while attending college at UCSB: 6587 Del Playa Drive.

The band played at the 2009 Harmony Festival, and also at the Rothbury Music Festival in the Summer of 2009.

Rebelution performed at the 2010 Harmony Festival in Santa Rosa, California along with other well-known acts such as The Expendables, Slightly Stoopid and Lauryn Hill. They also performed at All Good Music Festival, Bonnaroo, Lollapalooza, Austin City Limits and Wakarusa music festivals in 2010.

Peace of Mind (2012)
On January 10, 2012, Rebelution released their third studio album, Peace Of Mind, through their own label 87 Music. Peace of Mind: Acoustic features all twelve original album tracks stripped-down acoustic as well as Peace of Mind: Dub remixed by Easy Star's Michael Goldwasser (Dub Side of The Moon, Radiodread, Easy Star's Lonely Hearts Dub Band). The album debuted at #13 on the Billboard 200 charts, #1 Independent and #1 Reggae Albums, and also the #4 iTunes album overall, selling 16,000 copies its first week, despite giving away half the album free to their fans over the six weeks prior to release.

Count Me In (2014)
In May 2014, Rebelution performed as a headlining act at the California Roots Music and Arts Festival in Monterey, California.

The band partnered with Easy Star Records to release their fourth album Count Me In features contributions from Don Carlos and Collie Buddz on June 10, 2014. It debuted as the #14 album on the Billboard 200 albums chart and the #1 Billboard Reggae album. Following the album's release, Rebelution went on the Count Me In tour with supporting acts Iration, The Green, and Stick Figure.

In September 2014, the band performed as a headlining act at California Roots and The Carolina Sessions Festival, as well as The Reggae Rise Up Festival in Tampa, Florida, which has quickly become one of the largest and respected Reggae festivals in the country.

In December 2014, Count Me In was named as the best-selling reggae album of the year by Billboard. An acoustic version of the album was released in 2015 and again topped the Billboard Reggae chart.

Falling Into Place (2016)
On June 3, 2016, the band released their fifth studio album Falling Into Place as a joint venture with Easy Star Records. The album debuted at #1 on the Billboard Reggae chart, and remained on the chart for more than 60 weeks. It also was #32 on Billboard's Top 200.

Free Rein (2018)
On June 15, 2018, the band released their sixth studio album Free Rein which included collaborations with acclaimed Jamaican producers Don Corleon and Winta James. Free Rein, and their 2019 Vinyl Box Set both reached #1 on the Billboard Top Reggae Albums chart. Free Rein also made it to #41 on Billboard's Top 200 chart.

The Dub Collection (2020)

Instead of creating a dub version of Free Rein, Rachmany wanted to reward fans by releasing a whole new dub album. On July 17, 2020, Rebelution released The Dub Collection which was mixed by the band's current lead touring guitarist Kyle Ahern who previously won their "Jam With The Band" contest. The album features dub music versions of Rebelution's early material. It includes three "fan-favorite" songs from each of their studio albums. The album reached #8 on the Billboard Top Reggae Album charts.

In The Moment (2021)
Rebelution has announced their seventh studio album titled, In The Moment, which was released on June 18, 2021 through 87 Music and Easy Star Records. The album includes 15 tracks (with an acoustic version of one of their songs, "To Be Younger"). It  features guest appearances by Jamaican reggae artists Keznamdi, Kabaka Pyramid, and Busy Signal, American soul singer Durand Jones, and The Indications. The album was produced and coordinated by their own touring guitarist Kyle Ahern. In The Moment debuted at #2 on the Billboard Reggae Albums chart and #36 on Independent Albums chart. It also debuted at #22 on Billboard's Current Albums Sales chart, and #35 on Billboard's Top Album Sales chart.

On May 20, 2022, Rebelution released a their second live album, titled Live in St. Augustine, which was recorded during sold-out 2021 live performance of their 23-song set at the St. Augustine Amphitheatre in St. Augustine, Florida

Other projects 
Rebelution worked with Florida-based breweries Rock Brothers Brewing and Cigar City Brewing to create Rebelution IPA in Summer 2016.

In 2018, the band partnered with Lost Abby & The Hop Concept to create "Take On Anything" IPA, which is available in stores across California and online.

In addition, Rebelution teamed up with FlavRx to release all-natural cannabis oil cartridges in two strains – Sour Tsunami Sativa and Cali-O Indica, as well as a customized oil battery pen and herb vaporizer. These products are available in select dispensaries in California which carry Flavrx products, with distribution growing to other legal states shortly. The band will be donating a portion of all proceeds towards Cannabis related medical research and legalization organizations.

Awards and honors 
After its debut album was one of the most downloaded reggae albums on iTunes, Rebelution's Courage to Grow was named the iTunes Editors Choice: Best Reggae Album 2007.

Rebelution received their first Grammy nomination in 2017 when their album Falling Into Place was nominated for the "Best Reggae Album" award.

In December 2021, Rebelution was nominated for the fans-choice "2021 Album of the Year" award by Surf Roots TV & Radio for their album In The Moment. Voting was determined by Facebook, Instagram and Twitter users. This was the band's first time being nominated with the reggae rock streaming TV channel on Amazon Fire TV, Apple TV, and Roku.

Lineup
Current members
 Eric Rachmany – Vocals, Guitar, Songwriter (2004–present)
 Rory Carey – Keyboards (2004–present)
 Marley D. Williams – Bass (2004–present)
 Wesley Finley – Drums (2004–present)

Touring members

 Zach Meyerowitz – Trumpet (2014–present)
 Kyle Ahern – Guitar (2016–present)
 Eric Hirschhorn – Saxophone (2018–present)

Former members
 Matt Velasquez – Vocals, Guitar, Songwriter (2004–2007)

Former touring members
 Khris Royal – Saxophone (2011–2014)
 Mike Eyia – Saxophone (2014–2018) *died in February 2018.

Discography

Studio albums

EPs/Live albums

Dub albums

Acoustic albums

Singles

Compilations
Rebelution Vinyl Box Set (2019)

Collaborations
Rebelution (Eric Rachmany) has collaborated or was featured on songs with artists and bands throughout the years.

Zion I – "Many Stylez" (2010)
I Wayne – "So High" (2011)
Tribal Seeds – "Soundwaves" (2011)
Thrive – "Just Fine" (2013)
Amp Live – "Signs" (2014) 
MAAD T-RAY – "Don't Stress No One" (2015)
Stick Figure – "Mind Block" (2015)
Through The Roots – "Bear With Me" (2015)
Morgan Heritage – "Wanna Be Loved" (2016)
The Expendables – "Stay Now" (2017)
HIRIE – "Sun and Shine" (2017)
The Green – "Good Feeling" (2017)
Ballyhoo! – "Let Her Go" (feat. Reel Big Fish) (2018)
"This Chick Is Wack" (2020)
Kyle Ahern – "Good Will Come" (2018)
Arise Roots – "Come And Get It" (feat. Slightly Stoopid) (2019)
Iration – "Right Here Right Now" (feat. Stick Figure) (2020)
Sun Dried Vibes – "Smoke Session" (feat. Jeremy Anderson of Treehouse!) (2020)
SOJA – "The Day You Came" (feat. Ali Campbell of UB40) (2021)

References

External links 
 

Musical groups from California
Musical groups established in 2004
American reggae musical groups
Musicians from Santa Barbara, California
Reggae rock groups
University of California, Santa Barbara alumni
Easy Star Records artists